John Lyons VC (1824 – 20 April 1867) was born in County Carlow, Ireland and was an Irish recipient of the Victoria Cross, the highest and most prestigious award for gallantry in the face of the enemy that can be awarded to British and Commonwealth forces.

Details
He was approximately 32 years old, and a private in the 19th Regiment of Foot (later The Yorkshire Regiment - Alexandra, Princess of Wales's Own), British Army, during the Crimean War when the following deed took place for which he was awarded the VC.

On 10 June 1855 at Sebastopol, in the Crimean Peninsula, Private Lyons picked up a live shell which had fallen among the guard of the trenches, and threw it over the parapet, thus saving many lives.

Further information
He later served in the Indian Mutiny and achieved the rank of Corporal. He died in Naas, County Kildare on 20 April 1868

The medal
His Victoria Cross is displayed at the Green Howards Museum (Richmond, Yorkshire, England).

References

Listed in order of publication year 
The Register of the Victoria Cross (1981, 1988 and 1997)

Ireland's VCs  (Dept of Economic Development, 1995)
Monuments to Courage (David Harvey, 1999)
Irish Winners of the Victoria Cross (Richard Doherty & David Truesdale, 2000)

External links
Location of grave and VC medal (Co. Kildare, Ireland).
 Northern Echo

1824 births
1867 deaths
19th-century Irish people
Irish soldiers in the British Army
People from County Carlow
Green Howards soldiers
Crimean War recipients of the Victoria Cross
Irish recipients of the Victoria Cross
British Army personnel of the Crimean War
British military personnel of the Indian Rebellion of 1857
British Army recipients of the Victoria Cross
Military personnel from County Carlow